The 2nd Maryland Infantry, CSA (known initially as the First Maryland Battalion), was a Confederate infantry regiment made up of volunteers from Maryland who, despite their home state remaining loyal to the Union during the American Civil War, chose instead to fight for the Confederacy. The regiment was largely made up of volunteers from the 1st Maryland Infantry, CSA, which was disbanded in August 1862, its initial term of duty having expired. They saw action at many of the fiercest battles of the Civil War, taking part in the brutal fighting at Culp's Hill at the Battle of Gettysburg. The unit suffered such severe casualties during the war that, by the time of General Robert E. Lee's surrender at Appomattox Court House on April 9, 1865, only around forty men remained.

History

Disbandment of the 1st Maryland Infantry
In August 1862 the 1st Maryland Infantry, CSA was disbanded at Gordonsville, Virginia, at the expiry of its initial twelve-month term of duty. The 1st Maryland Infantry was a regiment of the Confederate army, formed shortly after the commencement of the American Civil War in April 1861. The unit was made up of volunteers from Maryland, and saw action at the First Battle of Manassas and in the Shenandoah Valley Campaign. In September 1862 its former commander, Colonel Bradley Tyler Johnson, and many members of his staff offered their services to General "Stonewall Jackson".

Formation of the 2nd Maryland Infantry

After the disbandment of the 1st Maryland Infantry, the rank and file soldiers of the former regiment found themselves in a precarious position. They were unable to return home to Maryland, having effectively committed themselves to the Confederacy for the duration of the war. With little choice but to fight on, many went on to join other units of artillery, or cavalry, while others waited to form a new Maryland Infantry Regiment. The new unit was known as the 1st Maryland Battalion until officially re-designated in January 1864 as the 2nd Maryland Infantry.  The change was made in order to distinguish it from the original regiment.

Several former officers of the 1st Maryland, such as Captains William Murray, James Herbert, and Lieutenants George Thomas, Clapham Murray and William Zollinger began to recruit veterans for the new regiment, and in addition fresh recruits from Maryland.

Soon, two companies under Captain Murray and Captain J. Parran Crane were formed, followed by three more. By October 1862 more than five hundred men had joined the unit, now a battalion, which was soon assigned to the command of General George Hume "Maryland" Steuart' in Winchester, Virginia. The new battalion held an election in which Captain Herbert was elected to the rank of Major. In November the Battalion was assigned to the command of General William "Grumble" Jones (so called because of his cantankerous nature), who had taken command of Thomas T. Munford's brigade of cavalry.

Eventually the Battalion grew in size, and new elections were held. The commander of the old regiment, Colonel Bradley Tyler Johnson, was duly elected Lieutenant Colonel, but he declined the offer. In the end Major Herbert was elected Lieutenant Colonel, and Captain W. W. Goldsborough, who would later go on to chronicle the history of the Maryland Line in the Civil War, was elected Major.

Winter of 1862–63
The regiment spent the harsh winter of 1862–3 in the Shenandoah Valley, without seeing action. Few of the men were equipped with tents, most slept in the open on the frozen ground and, according to Goldsborough, "it was no unusual thing to see several hundred men arise from a covering of a foot of snow that had fallen during the night." In May 1863 the regiment was united with the Baltimore Light Artillery and Company A of the 1st Maryland Cavalry (CSA), as Colonel Johnson, under orders by the Secretary of War, began to organize the various Maryland units under one command, with a view to forming for the first time a true Maryland Line in the Confederate Army.

Gettysburg Campaign
In early summer of 1863, the 2nd Maryland (then still known as the 1st Maryland Battalion) was assigned to Steuart's Third Brigade, a force of around 2,200 men, in Major General Edward "Allegheny" Johnson's division, part of General Ewell's 2nd Corps in the Army of Northern Virginia. The brigade's former commander, Brigadier General Raleigh Colston, had been relieved of his command by Lee, who was disappointed by his performance at the Battle of Chancellorsville. The brigade consisted of the following regiments: the 1st Maryland, the 1st and 3rd North Carolina, and the 10th, 23rd, and 37th Virginia. Rivalries between the various state regiments had been a recurring problem in the brigade and Lee hoped that Steuart would be able to knit them together effectively. However, he had only been in command for a month when the Gettysburg Campaign got under way.

In June 1863 Lee's army advanced north into Maryland, taking the war into Union territory for the second time. The Marylanders were jubilant to be returning to their home state. Steuart is said to have jumped down from his horse, kissed his native soil and stood on his head; according to one of his aides: "We loved Maryland, we felt that she was in bondage against her will, and we burned with desire to have a part in liberating her". Quartermaster John Howard recalled that Steuart performed "seventeen double somersaults" all the while whistling Maryland, My Maryland.

2nd Battle of Winchester
In June 1863 the 1st Maryland Battalion saw action at the Second Battle of Winchester fought between June 13 and June 15. On June 13 the Marylanders fought with Federal cavalry and artillery just outside Newtown. On June 14 the 1st Maryland took part in the assault on Winchester, repelling two enemy attacks, and on June 15 the regiment took part in the final attack which led to the capture of Star Fort. Overall Steuart's Third Brigade took around 1,000 prisoners and suffered comparatively small losses of 9 killed, 34 wounded.

Battle of Gettysburg

Johnson's division, including the 1st Maryland, arrived at Gettysburg late in the afternoon on July 1, 1863, taking position on the far edge of the Confederate left at the foot of Culp's Hill; the men were exhausted after a 130-mile forced march. Culp's Hill was a rocky wooded hill topped by a line of well fortified enemy breastworks.

On July 2 the Confederates attacked the hill, with the 1st Maryland, the 10th, 23rd and 37th Virginia regiments, and 3rd North Carolina regiment, all assaulting the Union breastworks, defended by General George S. Greene's 12th Corps. The Marylanders and others were initially able to breach the works and drive out Green's men, and they held their position until the next morning, July 3.

The morning of July 3 revealed the full scale of the Union defenses, as enemy artillery opened fire at a distance of 500 yards with a "terrific and galling fire", followed by a ferocious assault on the Marylander's position. The result was a "terrible slaughter" of the Third Brigade, which fought for many hours without relief, exhausting their ammunition, but successfully holding their position. Then, late on the morning of July 3, General Johnson ordered a bayonet charge against the well-fortified enemy lines. Steuart was appalled, and was strongly critical of the attack, but direct orders could not be disobeyed. The Third Brigade attempted several times to wrest control of Culp's Hill, a vital part of the Union Army defensive line, and the result was a "slaughterpen", as the First Maryland and the Third North Carolina regiments courageously charged a well-defended position strongly held by three brigades, a few reaching within twenty paces of the enemy lines. So severe were the casualties among his men that Steuart is said to have broken down and wept, wringing his hands and crying "my poor boys". Overall, the failed attack on Culp's Hill cost Johnson's division almost 2,000 men, of which 700 were accounted for by Steuart's brigade alone—far more than any other brigade in the division. At Hagerstown, on the 8th July, out of a pre-battle strength of 2,200, just 1,200 men reported for duty. The casualty rate among the First Maryland and Third North Carolina was between one half and two-thirds, in the space of just ten hours.

After Gettysburg, during a review of the Army of Northern Virginia, General Johnson commented to General Robert E. Lee as the Marylanders marched past: "General, they were as steady as that at Gettysburg." Aware of the casualties taken by the Marylanders at the recent battle, Lee honored the regiment, now reduced to Battalion strength, by removing his hat to the men.

Formation of the Maryland Line
On October 22, 1863, the 2nd Maryland Regiment was detached from Steuart's Brigade and assigned to the newly formed Maryland Line, travelling by rail to Hanover Junction, Virginia, where they met the 1st Maryland Cavalry, CSA, the Baltimore Light Artillery, CSA, the 1st Maryland Artillery, CSA, and the 4th Maryland Artillery, CSA. At this time all Marylanders serving in the Army of Northern Virginia were invited to join the newly formed Maryland Line. Few however did so, as the men were by now reluctant to break up units which had already fought together for over two years.

On January 20, 1864, while camped at Hanover Junction, the unit known up to that time as the First Maryland Battalion was official re-designated the Second Maryland Infantry by order of the Confederate Secretary of War.

By May 1864 the 2nd Maryland could muster barely 325 men, and found itself assigned to the command of General John C. Breckinridge, though not attached to any brigade.

Battle of Cold Harbor
The regiment saw action in June 1864 at the Battle of Cold Harbor, in which General Robert E. Lee's outnumbered men managed to defeat General Ulysses S. Grant's much larger force. On the morning of June 3 the Marylanders were attacked by Federal troops, and mounted a counter-attack. The Marylanders gained the guns of the attacking Union troops and turned them on the Federals, firing canister rounds until "nearly a hundred men were stretched on the plain, from the fire of the Second Maryland Infantry, and many others captured."

After the battle the 2nd Maryland became attached to Frye's Brigade, Heth's Division, Hill's Corps, and on June 13 they took part in the Battle of White Oak Swamp. On June 18 the regiment crossed the James River and went by rail to Petersburg, where they set up defensive breastworks. The Siege of Petersburg was underway, and for the next few months the men lived in their trenches, exchanging occasional fire with the Union attackers.

Siege of Petersburg
On August 19 a fierce Union assault saw the 2nd Maryland engaged in fierce combat. On August 20, forming a part of General James J. Archers Brigade, it managed to breach the Federal defenses, but the men were unable to hold their position and were thrown back in brutal fighting, by the end of which almost a third of the regiment were dead, wounded or captured. During the Battle of Peebles' Farm the regiment would lose a further 53 men dead and wounded. By this time they had ceased to exist as an effective fighting force.

1865 and surrender
On February 5, 1865, what remained of the regiment saw further fighting at the Battle of Hatcher's Run, after which the unit effectively fell apart. By the time of General Robert E. Lee's surrender at Appomattox Court House on April 9, only around forty men were present to surrender to the Union army.

See also

History of the Maryland Militia in the Civil War
Maryland in the American Civil War
Maryland Civil War Confederate units
Maryland Line (CSA)

References
Booth, George W., Personal Reminiscences of a Maryland Soldier in the War Between the States, 1861-1865. Lincoln, NE: U NE press, 2000 reprint of 1898 ed.
Ernst, Kathleen. Accompanied by Cries of 'Go It, Boys! Maryland Whip Maryland! Two 1st Marland Infantries Clashed. America's CW. July 1994: pp. 10, 12, 14 & 16.
Field, Ron, et al., The Confederate Army 1861-65: Missouri, Kentucky & Maryland Osprey Publishing (2008), Retrieved March 4, 2010
Goldsborough, W.W., p. 285-91, Grant's Change of Base: The Horrors of the Battle of Cold Harbor, From a Soldier's Notebook. Southern Hist Soc Papers 29 (1901)
 Goldsborough, W. W., The Maryland Line in the Confederate Army, Guggenheimer Weil & Co (1900), .
Howard, McHenry. Recollections of a Maryland Confederate Soldier and Staff Officer Under Johnston, Jackson and Lee. Dayton, OH: Morningside, 1975. Reprint of 1914 ed.
Johnson, Bradley T. The Cause of the Confederate States: Address Delivered Before the Society of the Army and Navy of the Confederate States, in the State of Maryland, and the Association of the Maryland Line, at Maryland Hall, Baltimore, Md., November 16th, 1886. Baltimore: A.J. Conlon, 1886.
McKim, Randolph H. A Soldier's Recollections: Leaves From the Diary of a Young Confederate. NY: Longmans, Green, 1911.
McKim, Randolph H., Detailed account of Steuart's brigade in action at Gettysburg, by his aide-de-camp, Rev. Randolph H. McKim Retrieved on Jan 8 2010
Swank, Walbrook D. Courier for Lee and Jackson: 1861-1865-Memoirs. [John Gill] Shippensburg, MD: White Mane, 1993.

Archival Collections
Civil War Memoirs of Washington Hands - served in 1st Maryland Infantry, and in the Baltimore Light Artillery. University of Virginia Library, Special Collections Department, Alderman Library, Charlottesville, VA.
Bradley T. Johnson Papers, University of Virginia Library, Special Collections Department, Alderman Library, Charlottesville, Virginia.
Muster Roll of 1st Maryland Infantry, Fray Angelico Chavez History Library, Santa Fe, New Mexico.
Photographs of unit members, Photo Collection, USAMHI, Carlisle, PA
Selvage, Edwin HCWRTCollGACColl, USAHMI, Carlisle, PA

Notes

External links
 The Maryland line in the Confederate States Army. Published by Gale Cengage Learning,  Retrieved February 20, 2010
 "Company D" 2nd Maryland Infantry
 Maryland Civil War units at www.2ndmdinfantryus.org/csunits.html Retrieved February 20, 2010
Re-enactment society of the 1st Maryland Infantry Retrieved May 10, 2010

Units and formations of the Confederate States Army from Maryland
1862 establishments in Maryland
1865 disestablishments in Maryland
Military units and formations disestablished in 1865